Ignacio Vázquez (born 15 June 1997) is an Argentine professional footballer who plays as a centre-back for All Boys.

Career
Vázquez's career started in the ranks of Primera B Nacional's All Boys. After going unused on the substitutes bench for fixtures against Almagro and Chacarita Juniors, Vázquez made his bow in professional football on 27 May 2017 in a home defeat to San Martín; coming on in the second half in place of Sebastián Ibars. He featured five times in their relegation campaign of 2017–18, one of which was his starting debut against Sarmiento in April 2018. In the succeeding March, Vázquez scored his first goal in Primera B Metropolitana in a draw with Tristán Suárez. They were promoted in 2018–19, as Vázquez scored twice in the play-offs.

Ahead of the 2019–20 campaign, Vázquez was loaned to fellow Primera B Nacional team Belgrano. Fourteen appearances followed. On 22 October 2020, Vázquez signed a new contract with All Boys until December 2022 before heading out on loan to Primera B de Chile side San Luis. After debuting in a defeat to Magallanes on 4 November, the centre-back netted a goal in a loss to Ñublense on 16 November. 

Vázquez returned to All Boys for the 2021 season. However, due to deadline issues, the club wasn't able to register him for the roster, which was why he in March 2021 was loaned out again, this time to Uruguayan club Cerro Largo.

Personal life
In March 2019, Vázquez was involved in a traffic collision whilst travelling along National Route A002 with teammates Matías Bracamonte and Rodrigo Díaz. All three escaped without major trauma, though Vázquez suffered a head injury without the loss of consciousness.

Career statistics
.

References

External links

1997 births
Living people
Argentine footballers
Argentine expatriate footballers
People from Hurlingham Partido
Association football defenders
Sportspeople from Buenos Aires Province
Primera Nacional players
Primera B Metropolitana players
Primera B de Chile players
Uruguayan Primera División players
All Boys footballers
Club Atlético Belgrano footballers
San Luis de Quillota footballers
Cerro Largo F.C. players
Expatriate footballers in Chile
Expatriate footballers in Uruguay
Argentine expatriate sportspeople in Chile
Argentine expatriate sportspeople in Uruguay